The Walsh–Lebesgue theorem is a famous result from harmonic analysis proved by the American mathematician Joseph L. Walsh in 1929, using results proved by Lebesgue in 1907. The theorem states the following:

Generalizations

In 1974 Anthony G. O'Farrell gave a generalization of the Walsh–Lebesgue theorem by means of the 1964 Browder–Wermer theorem with related techniques.

References

Theorems in harmonic analysis
Theorems in approximation theory